Aldo Tortorella (born 10 July 1926) is an Italian journalist, former politician and partisan. He was a historical member of the Italian Communist Party (Partito Comunista Italiano, or PCI).

Biography
Tortorella was born in Naples, but spent his youth in Genoa and Milan. When he was a university student, he became a member of the Milanese resistance movement against fascism. He was imprisoned, but he was later able to escape to Genoa. After the liberation of Northern Italy, Tortorella became journalist (and eventually vice-director) for the Genoese edition of  PCI's newspaper, L'Unità. In 1958-1962 he was vice-director of the Milanese edition and director of the national edition from 1970 to 1975.

Tortorella was elected to the Italian Chamber of Deputies for the first time in 1972, a position he held until 1994. A follower of national secretary Enrico Berlinguer, he was the party's responsible for culture. In the late 1970s he was against Berlinguer's move towards the so-called Historic Compromise (Compromesso storico), which aimed to a government alliance between PCI and the other Italian main party of the period, Democrazia Cristiana.

In 1989 Tortorella was one of the main opponents of the Svolta della Bolognina, the change of PCI's name supported by new secretary Achille Occhetto. However, when PCI became the Democratic Party of the Left (Partito Democratico della Sinistra, PDS), he remained in the party as member of the left-current led by Giovanni Berlinguer. In 1999, at the outbreak of the Kosovo War, Tortorella abandoned PDS in polemics with the then-prime minister and party leader, Massimo D'Alema, who had  Italy take an active part in the conflict.

Tortorella in the following year dedicated to his leftist magazine, Critica Marxista, and organized cultural activities dealing with Enrico Berlinguer's figure and politics.

Sources

1926 births
Possibly living people
Politicians from Naples
Italian Communist Party politicians
20th-century Italian politicians
Democratic Party of the Left politicians
Journalists from Naples
Italian male journalists
Italian resistance movement members
L'Unità editors